Palazuelos de Eresma is a municipality located in the province of Segovia, Castile and León, Spain. 
It takes its name from the River Eresma.

Demography
According to the 2021 census (INE), the municipality had a population o5 59793 inhabitants.

Culture

Heritage 

 Parish Church of Nuestra Señora de la Asunción, in the late Gothic style, originally Romanesque, was restored in 2021. It has a Baroque main altarpiece, a silver processional cross and a Monstrance of the Sun created in Segovia in the 18th century;
 Parish Church of Our Lady of the Rosary;
 DYC whiskey factory, founded in 1959 by Nicomedes García;
 Boilers of the Cambrones river;
 Alto Eresma Green Path;
 Remains of a Roman villa and later Visigothic necropolis;
 The Barbers bunker with origins in the Civil War, located in a place known as the Balcón de Pilatos located next to the river Eresma;
 Hermitage of San Antonio de Padua;
 Remains of the old paper factory of the old Marqués del Arco mill;
 Estate and royal palace of the Quinta de Quitapesares;
 Remains of the buckle factory, the old Gamones mill;
 Remains of shearing ranches;
 Shoe rack, next to the Trescasas road;
 Caceras del Cambrones and Navalcaz;
 Bridge of the Merinas over the Eresma.

Holidays

Throughout the municipality 

 Battering;
 Cacera Mayor Day, last Saturday of May.

Palazuelos de Eresma 

 Anthony of Padua, June 13;
 Assumption of Mary, on August 15.

References

Municipalities in the Province of Segovia